= Wigan Examiner =

English newspaper

- Format: Broadsheet
- Founded: 1853
- Ceased publication: 1961
- Headquarters: Wigan, England

The Wigan Examiner was a newspaper published in Wigan, Lancashire, England. It was published from 1853 to 1961.

The Wigan Examiner was first issued on 25 November 1853, and was printed and published by John Pollard. It was seen as a successor to the Wigan Times, which had recently ceased publication. Initially a weekly newspaper, it later increased its publication schedule to three times a week before finally becoming a biweekly newspaper. Due to rising costs and loss of advertising, the newspaper ceased publication on 9 June 1961.

Founded as a Liberal newspaper, it was transformed into a Conservative-supporting publication following its purchase by new owners in 1867.

The newspaper was printed in various locations during its early history before establishing more permanent facilities on Market Street. From 1905 onwards, the newspaper's offices were located in Public Hall on King Street.
